W. B. Ryan was a South African cricket umpire. He stood in two Test matches between 1930 and 1931, both during England's tour of South Africa.

See also
 List of Test cricket umpires

References

Year of birth missing
Year of death missing
Place of birth missing
South African Test cricket umpires